The Living Planet Programme (LPP) is a programme within the European Space Agency which is managed by the Earth Observation Programmes Directorate. LPP consists of two classes of Earth observation missions (listed below) including research missions known as Earth Explorers, and the Earth Watch class of missions whose objective is to develop support operational applications such as numerical weather forecasting or resource management.

List of Earth Explorers missions

Selected missions
Currently there are ten approved Earth Explorer missions, four (SMOS, CryoSat-2, SWARM, Aeolus) of which are in orbit and operating:
 GOCE – Gravity Field and Steady-State Ocean Circulation Explorer; it was launched on 17 March 2009. It reentered the atmosphere on 11 November 2013.
 SMOS – Soil Moisture and Ocean Salinity satellite will study ocean salinity and soil moisture; it was launched on 2 November 2009.
 CryoSat – a program designed to map the Earth's ice cover.
 CryoSat-1 was lost in 2005 when the Russian SS-19 Rockot launch vehicle malfunctioned and was terminated.
 CryoSat-2 was launched on 8 April 2010.
 Swarm – a trio of satellites to map the Earth's magnetic field. The SWARM constellation was launched successfully on 22 November 2013.
 Aeolus – the Atmospheric Dynamics Mission Aeolus uses an innovative laser to measure global winds. Aeolus was successfully launched on 22 August 2018.

Approved, but yet to launch :
 EarthCARE – Earth Clouds Aerosols and Radiation Explorer will examine the formation and effects of clouds. Due to launch in 2024.
 BIOMASS – designed to calculate the amount of carbon stored in the world's forests, and to monitor for any changes over the course of its five-year mission. Due to launch in 2024.
 FLEX – the FLuorescence EXplorer mission will globally monitor steady-state chlorophyll fluorescence in terrestrial vegetation. It is currently scheduled to launch in 2025.
 FORUM – Far-infrared Outgoing Radiation Understanding and Monitoring; a mission to measure Earth's outgoing radiation emissions across the entire far-infrared electromagnetic spectrum, in order to gain insight into water vapour and cirrus cloud regulation of the planet's surface temperature. It is currently projected to launch in 2027.
 Harmony (formerly known as Stereoid) – a pair of synthetic aperture radar satellites that aims to further the study of ocean circulation patterns, glacial dynamics, and changes in land-surface topography. It is currently projected to launch in 2029.

Earth Explorer 11 Candidates
The competition for the Earth Explorer 11 mission began on 10 June 2021. A call for proposal ideas was released on 25 May 2020, with the deadline for submission on 4 December 2020. Four candidates have been chosen to compete for the opportunity:

 Cairt (Changing-Atmosphere Infra-Red Tomography Explorer) – a mission to observe atmospheric chemistry and dynamics in the altitude range of 5 to 120 km, in order to better understand the relationship between climate change and atmospheric circulation.
 Nitrosat – a mission to precisely measure nitrogen dioxide and ammonia levels in the atmosphere, which is essential to understanding the role of nitrogen compounds in aerosol pollution.
 Wivern (Wind Velocity Radar Nephoscope) – a mission to measure cloud wind velocity, rain, snow, and ice water via a Doppler radar nephoscope, in order to improve weather forecast models.
 Seastar – a mission to study sub-mesoscale meteorological dynamics by providing 1 km resolution ocean surface current and wind vectors for coast, shelf, and polar ice zones.

Down-selections will be made in 2023 and 2025. The winning candidate is projected to launch in 2031 or 2032.

Non-selected missions
Past candidate missions that were not selected include:
 CoReH2O – a mission to study key characteristics in terrestrial snow, ice, and water cycles and their relations to climate change and variability. Competed with BIOMASS and PREMIER for the Earth Explorer 7 mission opportunity.
 PREMIER – a mission to study atmospheric processes related to trace gas, radiation, and chemical compositions in the mid to upper troposphere and lower stratosphere in order to understand their role on climate change. Competed with BIOMASS and CoReH2O for the Earth Explorer 7 mission opportunity.
 CarbonSat – a mission to determine the global distributions of carbon dioxide and methane and their impact on climate change. Competed with FLEX for the Earth Explorer 8 mission opportunity.
 SKIM – a mission to measure ocean-surface currents using the Doppler technique, in order to improve understanding of the ocean current dynamics behind the hydrological and geochemical cycles. Competed with FORUM for the Earth Explorer 9 mission opportunity.
 Daedalus – a mission to study the electrodynamic processes of the Earth's thermosphere and ionosphere. Competed with Harmony for the Earth Explorer 10 mission opportunity.
 Hydroterra (formerly known as G-Class) – a geosynchronous synthetic aperture radar satellite that aims to observe diurnal water cycle processes, in order to improve weather prediction capabilities. Competed with Harmony for the Earth Explorer 10 mission opportunity.

References

European Space Agency programmes